Sobralia is a genus of orchids native to Mexico, Central and South America. The plants are more commonly terrestrial, but are also found growing epiphytically, in wet forests from sea level to about 8,800 ft. The genus was named for Dr. Francisco Sobral, a Spanish botanist. The genus is abbreviated Sob in trade journals.

Their reed-like stems range in height from about 1 ft (33 cm) (such as in Sobralia galeottiana) to 44 ft. (13.4 m) (in Sobralia altissima). They have typically heavily veined, bilobed, plicate, apical leaves all along the stem. The inflorescences on the apex of the stem carry one or two successive ephemeral flowers with large sepals and petals. The short duration of the flower is caused by a self-digesting enzyme. The lip is entire or lobed and clasps the column at its base. This columns carries eight soft pollinia. These flowers range in color from pure white to yellow, green, pink, purple, red, brown, and even a blue violet.

Taxonomy 
The following species are recognized:

 Sobralia aerata (C.K.Allen & L.O.Williams) Garay
 Sobralia allenii L.O.Williams
 Sobralia altissima D.E.Benn. & Christenson
 Sobralia amabilis (Rchb.f.) L.O.Williams
 Sobralia anceps Schltr.
 Sobralia andreae Dressler
 Sobralia antioquiensis Schltr.
 Sobralia aspera Dressler & Pupulin
 Sobralia atropubescens Ames & C.Schweinf. 
 Sobralia augusta Hoehne. 
 Sobralia aurantiaca Linden & Rchb.f. 
 Sobralia biflora Ruiz & Pav.
 Sobralia bimaculata Garay 
 Sobralia blancoi Dressler & Pupulin
 Sobralia bletiae Rchb.f.
 Sobralia boliviensis Schltr. 
 Sobralia buchtienii Schltr. 
 Sobralia calliantha D.E.Benn. & Christenson
 Sobralia callosa L.O.Williams
 Sobralia caloglossa Schltr.
 Sobralia candida (Poepp. & Endl.) Rchb.f.
 Sobralia carazoi Lank. & Ames
 Sobralia cardosoi Campacci & J.B.F.Silva
 Sobralia cataractarum Hoehne
 Sobralia cattleya Rchb.f. 
 Sobralia chatoensis A.H.Heller & A.D.Hawkes 
 Sobralia chrysantha Lindl. 
 Sobralia chrysoleuca Rchb.f.
 Sobralia chrysostoma Dressler
 Sobralia ciliata (C.Presl) C.Schweinf. ex Foldats
 Sobralia citrea Dressler
 Sobralia crispissima Dressler
 Sobralia crocea (Poepp. & Endl.) Rchb.f.
 Sobralia decora Bateman
 Sobralia densifoliata Schltr.
 Sobralia dichotoma Ruiz & Pav.
 Sobralia dissimilis Dressler 
 Sobralia dorbignyana Rchb.f.
 Sobralia doremiliae Dressler 
 Sobralia ecuadorana Dodson
 Sobralia exigua Dressler
 Sobralia exilis Schltr. 
 Sobralia fimbriata Poepp. & Endl.
 Sobralia fragilis Dressler & Bogarín
 Sobralia fragrans Lindl.
 Sobralia fruticetorum Schltr.
 Sobralia fuzukiae Dressler & Bogarín
 Sobralia galeottiana A.Rich.
 Sobralia gentryi Dodson 
 Sobralia gloriana Dressler 
 Sobralia gloriosa Rchb.f. 
 Sobralia granitica G.A.Romero & Carnevali
 Sobralia hagsateri Dodson 
 Sobralia hawkesii A.H.Heller 
 Sobralia helleri A.D.Hawkes
 Sobralia herzogii Schltr.
 Sobralia hirta D.E.Benn. & Christenson
 Sobralia hirtzii Dodson
 Sobralia hoppii Schltr.
 Sobralia imavieirae Campacci & J.B.F.Silva
 Sobralia infundibuligera Garay & Dunst.
 Sobralia kermesina Garay 
 Sobralia kerryae Dressler 
 Sobralia klotzscheana Rchb.f. 
 Sobralia kruskayae Dressler
 Sobralia labiata Warsz. & Rchb.f.
 Sobralia lancea Garay 
 Sobralia leucoxantha Rchb.f.
 Sobralia liliastrum Lindl. 
 Sobralia lindleyana Rchb.f. 
 Sobralia lowii Rolfe 
 Sobralia luerorum Dodson 
 Sobralia luteola Rolfe 
 Sobralia macdougallii Soto Arenas Pérez-García & Salazar
 Sobralia macra Schltr.
 Sobralia macrantha Lindl.
 Sobralia macrophylla Rchb.f.
 Sobralia madisonii Dodson 
 Sobralia maduroi Dressler 
 Sobralia malmiana Pabst 
 Sobralia malmquistiana Schltr.
 Sobralia margaritae Pabst
 Sobralia mariannae Dressler
 Sobralia mucronata Ames & C.Schweinf.
 Sobralia mutisii P.Ortiz 
 Sobralia neudeckeri Dodson 
 Sobralia nutans Dressler 
 Sobralia odorata Schltr. 
 Sobralia oliva-estevae Carnevali & I.Ramírez 
 Sobralia oroana Dodson 
 Sobralia paludosa Linden 
 Sobralia paradisiaca Rchb.f. 
 Sobralia pardalina Garay
 Sobralia parviflora L.O.Williams 
 Sobralia persimilis Garay
 Sobralia pfavii Schltr. 
 Sobralia piedadiae Dodson 
 Sobralia portillae Christenson 
 Sobralia powellii Schltr.
 Sobralia pulcherrima Garay 
 Sobralia pumila Rolfe
 Sobralia purpurea Dressler
 Sobralia purpurella Dressler & Bogarín
 Sobralia quinata Dressler
 Sobralia rarae-avis Dressler
 Sobralia recta Dressler
 Sobralia rhizophorae Cornejo & Dodson
 Sobralia rigidissima Linden ex Rchb.f. 
 Sobralia roezlii Rchb.f.
 Sobralia rogersiana Christenson
 Sobralia rolfeana Schltr. 
 Sobralia rondonii Hoehne 
 Sobralia rosea Poepp. & Endl.
 Sobralia roseoalba Rchb.f. 
 Sobralia ruckeri Linden & Rchb.f. 
 Sobralia ruparupaensis D.E.Benn. & Christenson
 Sobralia rupicola Kraenzl.
 Sobralia sancti-josephi Kraenzl.
 Sobralia sanctorum Dressler & Bogarín
 Sobralia sanfelicis Dressler 
 Sobralia schultzei Schltr. 
 Sobralia scopulorum Rchb.f.
 Sobralia semperflorens Kraenzl. 
 Sobralia setigera Poepp. & Endl. 
 Sobralia sobralioides (Kraenzl.) Garay
 Sobralia sororcula Dressler
 Sobralia sotoana Dressler & Bogarín
 Sobralia speciosa C.Schweinf. 
 Sobralia splendida Schltr. 
 Sobralia stenophylla Lindl.
 Sobralia stevensonii Dodson 
 Sobralia tamboana Dodson
 Sobralia theobromina Dressler
 Sobralia tricolor Dressler
 Sobralia turkeliae Christenson
 Sobralia undatocarinata C.Schweinf. 
 Sobralia uribei P.Ortiz 
 Sobralia valida Rolfe 
 Sobralia violacea Linden ex Lindl. 
 Sobralia virginalis Peeters & Cogn.
 Sobralia warszewiczii Rchb.f. 
 Sobralia weberbaueriana Kraenzl. 
 Sobralia wilsoniana Rolfe 
 Sobralia withneri D.E.Benn. & Christenson
 Sobralia xantholeuca B.S.Williams 
 Sobralia yauaperyensis Barb. Rodr.

Hybrids 
 Sobralia × intermedia P.H.Allen
 Sobralia × veitchii hort.

Gallery

References

External links 

 
 The Sobralia Pages website, by Nina Rach

 
Epiphytic orchids
Sobralieae genera
Orchids of Central America
Orchids of North America
Orchids of South America